Edgar Gabriel Marsden (25 March 1919 – 15 October 2010) was a Trinidad cricketer who played two matches of first-class cricket in 1949.

Edgar Marsden captained Trinidad in the only two first-class matches of the 1948-49 West Indies season, when Trinidad played Barbados twice at Kensington Oval, Bridgetown, over two weeks in January and February 1949. He batted in the lower middle order and made 30 runs in three innings.

He also played several times for South Trinidad in the Beaumont Cup in the 1940s, usually as opening batsman and captain.

He and his wife Jean lived in the seaside suburb of Bayshore in Diego Martin, about five kilometres west of Queen's Park Oval, Port of Spain.

References

External links
 
 

1919 births
2010 deaths
Trinidad and Tobago cricketers